BESS is a particle physics experiment carried by a balloon. BESS stands for Balloon-borne Experiment with Superconducting Spectrometer. BESS is a series of experiments that started in 1993, and a later incarnation, BESS-Polar, circled the Antarctic from December 13 to December 21, 2004, for a total of 8 days 17 hours and 2 minutes. This joint Japanese and American project is supported by the Laboratory for High Energy Astrophysics (LHEA) at NASA's GSFC and the KEK.

Overview
The mission of this experiment is to detect antiparticles in the cosmic radiation at high altitudes. It is therefore designed to be carried aloft by balloon. The central detection device is a magnetic spectrometer, that is used to identify all electrically charged particles crossing its main detection aperture. Mission members are working on improving the sensitivity and precision of this system with each new launch.

Scientific goals
Theories of the beginning of the Universe are based on the currently-known laws of particle physics, where matter is created from energy in such a way that equal amounts of particles and antiparticles are produced. If this is so, then an amount of antimatter equal to the amount of currently visible matter must exist—though there is an equal possibility the bulk of the antimatter may have been annihilated due to the mechanism of CP violation. The aim of BESS therefore is to quantify the amount of antiparticles in the local cosmos and so help to decide between these alternatives.

Up to this point, only antiprotons have been detected, which can be produced via collisions of the cosmic radiation with atoms in the thin atmosphere above the balloon. Therefore, two strategies are employed to obtain the value for the flux of antiparticles from outer space:
 Measure the properties of the antiproton flux precisely and look for deviations from the expected behavior of antiprotons created in the atmosphere.
 Look for larger antinuclei, for instance antihelium, that cannot be produced by collisions.

Additionally, the basic properties of standard particle fluxes will be measured with high precision.

External links
BESS webpage on the NASA website

High energy particle telescopes
Cosmic-ray experiments
Balloon-borne experiments
 Astronomical experiments in the Antarctic